Badam Natawan (Sindhi: بادام ناتوان,  March 1924 – 8 February 1988) was a Sindhi language writer. Her sister Roshan Ara Mughal and daughter Naseem Thebo were also famous writers. She was among the first few Sindhi female writers of Pakistan. She authored three books.

Childhood and personal life
Badam Natawan was born on 7 March 1924 in Shikarpur, Sindh, Pakistan. Her father's name was Muhammad Hassan. Her mother was a Head Mistress in a local school. She passed matriculation examination from the Bambay University. She had good command on Arabic, Persian, English and Sindhi languages. She was married to Mir Abdul Baqui Thebo who was resident of Village Ghari, Taluka Mehar, District Dadu. Her son Mir Thebo was a renowned political activist and communist leader. Her daughter Naseem Thebo was a renowned story writer who was also a faculty member of the Department of Economics of the University of Sindh, Jamshoro. Her second daughter Benazir Thebo and her sister Roshan Ara Mughal were also writers.

Literary achievements 
Badan Natawan started writing when most of the girls were not even allowed to go to school. She was among the first few Sindhi female writers. Her first book Shikasta Zindagi (Sindhi: شڪسته زندگي)(Unsuccessful Life) was published in 1950 in two volumes. This book was published by Bashir & Sons Karachi. Her second book Khush Khaslat Khatoon (Sindhi: خوش خصلت خاتون)(Good Mannered Woman) was published in 1956 by Sindhi Adabi Board Jamshoro. Her third book Qalbi Ujja (Sindhi: قلبي اڃ) was published in 1966 by Moulvi Muhammad Azeem & Sons, Shikarpur.

She also authored following books which are yet to be published:

 Runam Rat Phura (Sindhi: رنم رت ڦڙا)
 Khalwat Men (Sindhi: خلوت ۾)
 Nimani Nar (Sindhi: نماڻي نار)

Death 
Badam Natawan died on 8 February 1988.

References 

Writers from Sindh
Sindhi-language writers
Sindhi people
Sindhi female writers
Pakistani writers
Pakistani female writers
1924 births
1988 deaths